Give a Little Sweet Love is a song originally performed by German singer Mark Ashley featuring Systems in Blue, released as a single on June 19, 2006 in Germany. The song has appeared in Mark Ashley's album Heartbreak Boulevard, and Heaven & Hell: The Mixes by Systems in Blue. The song was claimed to be "the new meet-up of Modern Talking" by the media.

Track listing 
CD single
 "Give A Little Sweet Love" (Single Edit) - 3:36
 "I've Never Been So Lonely" (SIB Version) - 3:17
 "I've Never Been So Lonely" (Romantic Version) - 3:36
 "Give A Little Sweet Love" (Instrumental Version) - 3:36
 "I've Never Been So Lonely" (Instrumental Version) - 3:17

Personnel 
 Music: Tracks 1, 4 by Rolf Köhler and Detlef Wiedeke, 2, 3, 5 by Marcus Duppach, Rolf Köhler and Detlef Wiedeke
 Lyrics: Track 1 by Steven McKeers and Thomas Widrat, 2, 3 by Marcus Duppach, Steven McKeers and Thomas O'Neal
 Published by BlueSky Music
 Produced and arranged by Rolf Köhler and Detlef Wiedeke in Music Sternchen Records
 Recorded in Vintage Music & Hammermusic Studios
 Mixed and mastered by Rolf Köhler and Detlef Wiedeke in Vintage Music
 Vocals by Mark Ashley and Systems in Blue
 Photograph: Melanie Aumüller
 Cover artwork: www.tmjoy.de

References 

2006 singles
Systems in Blue songs
Mark Ashley (musician) songs
Songs written by Rolf Köhler
2006 songs
Songs written by Detlef Wiedeke